Men's Rugby union in England consists of 106 leagues, which includes professional leagues at the highest level, down to amateur regional leagues.  Promotion and relegation are in place throughout the system.

Women's Rugby union in England consists of 26 leagues, which includes a national semi-professional league at the highest level, down to amateur regional leagues.  Promotion and relegation are in place throughout the system, with the exception of the Women's Premiership.

History

Historically, there were no leagues allowed as these were seen as a sign of professionalism. In the 1970s the RFU allowed the creation of regional merit leagues with the most significant ones being the North, Midlands, South West and London merit leagues. In 1984 the RFU approved the creation of two national merit tables where clubs had to play a minimum of eight games against the clubs in their division. 1985 saw the creation of a third national merit league. In 1987 this was formed into a true national league system.

Previous restructures
The format and competitiveness of the leagues has changed greatly since the leagues were first formed and a widespread and global restructuring of the leagues was announced in November 2008, for implementation from the 2009–10 season. Under this new structure, the top league remained the 12-team Gallagher Premiership. The second tier league was rebranded and restructured as the RFU Championship which replaced the old National Division One. This league also had 12 teams, and like the Premiership, is professional. Beneath the two professional leagues, the National Leagues were restructured to include a new 16 team National League 1, 16 team National League 2 South and 16 team National League 2 North. The four top regional leagues became part of National League 3 at level five.

For the 2017-18 season, the National League 3 leagues were renamed to have Premier as part of their title in order to make a distinction between regional rugby union and the National Leagues above.  Other changes that season saw London 3 North East be replaced by two new leagues - London 3 Eastern Counties and London 3 Essex - with teams transferred depending on location.

Recent restructures

Community game
In 2020, it was announced that a new league structure would be implemented in the community game from 2022–23. The new structure which was partly in response to the COVID-19 pandemic will be reviewed every three years and saw the following changes:

 The size of leagues at levels 3 and 4 are capped at 14 teams (down from 16).
 The size of leagues at level 5 and below are capped at 12 teams (down from 14).
 Level 4 will consist of three leagues (up from 2).
 Level 5 will consist of six leagues (up from 4).
 Level 6 will consist of twelve leagues (up from 8).
 A shortened season and protected breaks over Christmas and at specified other times for player welfare.
 Leagues largely regional based to reduce travel.
 An optional cup competition introduced for level 5 and below.

Below level 6 leagues sizes will depend on number of teams and geographical location.

Professional game
In February 2021, the RFU approved a moratorium on relegation from both the Premiership and Championship in response to uncertainty caused by the COVID-19 pandemic. It was also confirmed that league structure and minimum standards criteria for promotion were being reviewed. The moratorium only covered relegation and did not include promotion from the Championship meaning the Premiership expanded to 13 teams with the Championship reduced to 11 in 2021–22 with the promotion of Saracens.

In June 2021, as part of the wider review the moratorium was extended by a further two years in the Premiership and also included relegation from the Championship in 2021–22 and promotion from the Championship following the 2022–23 season. This means the Premiership may be further expanded to 14 teams in 2022–23 and the Championship may be reduced to 10. A summary of changes is outlines below:

 Premiership expanded to 13 teams in 2021–22; Championship reduced to 11
 Premiership may expand to 14 teams in 2022–23; Championship may reduce to 10. No team relegated from Premiership or promoted from Championship
 Introduction of a play-off  between the bottom placed team in Premiership and top placed team in Championship in 2023–24 with the winner playing in the Premiership the following season.

Promotion remains subject to minimum standards which have been reviewed and include several factors.

Level 1: Premiership Rugby 
Premiership Rugby is the top level league in England, containing the best 11 professional clubs. The premiership still includes strict ground criteria and a salary cap that must be met by all participants. Promotion from the Championship remains (subject to eligibility), however the bottom side have not been relegated since the end of the 2019–20 season. The club seeking promotion must meet the minimum standards criteria. The champion is the top team in the RFU Championship after the league season. A play-off system was previously in place to decide  which team were crowned champions. It was hoped this would bring to an end a select number of clubs bouncing between the leagues. (For example, each season between 2005–06 and 2008–09 saw the club relegated to National Division One earning promotion to the Premiership the following season, and also either the promotion or relegation of Leeds Carnegie.) Debate still continues over the question of promotion and relegation, but with the strict criteria fears are reduced.

Level 2: RFU Championship
The new RFU Championship was formed in 2009–10 to provide a second tier of professional competition. The former National Division One was decreased from 16 clubs to 12 to accommodate the new fixture structure. For the first three seasons this included:

 a first phase of 22 regular season games
 for the top eight teams, a second group phase, with the teams split into two groups; the top two teams in each group advanced to promotion play-offs, with the winner earning promotion provided they met Premiership entry standards
 for the bottom four teams, a separate group phase, without a play-off, to determine the relegation place
 participation in a new British and Irish Cup with Irish, Scottish and Welsh clubs
 a minimum of 32 games per season

Starting with the 2012–13 season, the second group stage was discontinued. The top four teams at the end of the home-and-away season entered play-offs to determine the league champion, which earned promotion providing Premiership entry standards were met. The bottom team at the end of home-and-away season was relegated to, and replaced by the champions of, the third tier National League 1.

From 2017–18 through to 2019–20 and from 2021–22 the championship play-off was eliminated. The league-season champions earned automatic promotion (again, assuming that they meet Premiership standards). Relegation criteria did not change. However, there was a moratorium placed on relegation in both 2020–21 and 2021–22.

Levels 3-4: National Leagues
The new National League structure includes:

Level 3: National League 1
The National League 1 was decreased from 16 to 14 teams. This resulted in a 28-game season on a home and away basis. The champions are promoted to the level 2 RFU Championship, and the bottom three sides are relegated to the level 4 National League 2 East, National League 2 West or National League 2 North depending on geographical location.

Level 4: National League 2 East, National League 2 West and National League 2 North 
The fourth tier is increased to three leagues of 14 teams each. The three league champions are promoted, with the bottom two in each league relegated to their respective regional division.

Regional leagues
With the restructuring, levels 5–11 became the new regional system. There are now 6 Regional 1 leagues, which are connected to the national leagues by promotion and relegation.

The system
The table below shows the current structure of the system. For each division, its official name, sponsorship name (which differs from its historic name) and number of clubs is given. At levels 1–3, each division promotes to the national division(s) that lie directly above it and relegates to the national division(s) that lie directly below it. Below that level, clubs relegate to the nearest local league.

See also

 Rugby union in England

References

External links
 http://www.scrum.com/scrum/rugby/story/86076.html (Explains new structure)
https://www.englandrugby.com/news/article/final-league-positions-for-community-game-confirmed-qazxsw (shows Level 2-5 Women's structure)

Sports league systems